The following is a list of the Dead Sea Scrolls from the cave 8 near Qumran.

Description
Wadi Qumran Cave 8, along with caves 7 and 9, was one of the only caves that are accessible by passing through the settlement at Qumran. Carved into the southern end of the Qumran plateau, cave 8 was excavated by archaeologists in 1957. Cave 8 produced five fragments: Genesis (8QGen), Psalms (8QPs), a tefillin fragment (8QPhyl), a mezuzah (8QMez), and a hymn (8QHymn). Cave 8 also produced several tefillin cases, a box of leather objects, tons of lamps, jars, and the sole of a leather shoe.

List of manuscripts
Some resources for more complete information on the Dead Sea Scrolls are the book by Emanuel Tov, "Revised Lists of the Texts from the Judaean Desert" for a complete list of all of the Dead Sea Scroll texts, as well as the online webpages for the Shrine of the Book and the Leon Levy Collection, both of which present photographs and images of the scrolls and fragments themselves for closer study. Information is not always comprehensive, as content for many scrolls has not yet been fully published.
{|class="wikitable"
|-
! Fragment or Scroll Identifier
! Fragment or Scroll Name
! Alternative Identifier
! English Bible Association
! Language
! Date/Script
! Description
! Reference
|-
!colspan="8" style="background:#b8c7d6;"|
Qumran Cave 8
|-
|8QGen
|Genesis
|8Q1
|Genesis 17:12–13, 15, 18–19; 18:20–22, 24–25
|Hebrew
|Herodian
|
|
|-
|8QPs
|Psalms
|8Q2
|Psalm 17:5–9, 14; 18:5–12
|Hebrew
|Herodian
|
|
|-
|8QPhyl||Phylacteries
|8Q3||Exodus 13:1–16; 12:43–51; 20:11
Deuteronomy 6:4–5; 6:1–3; 10:20–22; 10:12–19; 5:1–14; 10:13; 11:2–3; 10:21–22; 11:1; 11:6–12
||Hebrew
|1–100 CE
Herodian
|| Fragments from a "Phylactery" || 
|-
|8QMez||Mezuzah
|8Q4||Deuteronomy 10:1–11:21||Hebrew
|30 BCE–68 CE
Herodian
|| || 
|-
|8QHymn
|Unidentified hymn
|8Q5
|
|Hebrew
|Herodian
|Non-biblical composition.
|
|}

See also 
 Biblical manuscripts
 Septuagint manuscripts
 List of Hebrew Bible manuscripts

References

Sources

External links
 A Catalog of Biblical Passages in the Dead Sea Scrolls by David Washburn, 2002
 Textual Criticism: Recovering the Text of the Hebrew Bible by Peter Kyle McCarter, 1986

Dead Sea Scrolls